Long Live may refer to:

 Vive, viva, and vivat, interjections used in the Romance languages usually translated to English as "long live"

Music
 Long Live (Atreyu album) and song of the same name.
 Long Live (The Chariot album)
 "Long Live" (Taylor Swift song)
 "Long Live" (Florida Georgia Line song)

See also